A Hollow Triumph After All is the third studio album by American singer-songwriter Radiator King. It was independently released on April 28, 2017.

A Hollow Triumph After All is a concept album, described as “a telling of situations that mark the passing of time.” Sole member Adam Silvestri explains, “It’s this character walking through scenes in his life, experiences he’s had...In the end, he’s sort of depleted, exhausted, recollecting back on life and recognizing that the end destination he sought the whole time wasn’t as important as he thought.” 

The album has been met with positive reviews, with The Santa Fe New Mexican stating, “it is punk, guttural, and often joyful in its whiskey-soaked sadness”

Track listing

Personnel
Radiator King
Adam Silvestri – guitar and vocals

Additional musicians
 Shaul Eshet – piano, organ, vibraphone, synth
Brian Viglione – drums, percussion
Jordan Scannella – electric bass, upright bass 
Adam Brisbin – lead guitar 
Peter Hess – bass clarinet, tenor saxophone, horn arrangements 
Tim Vaughn – trombone 
Justin Mullens – trumpet, French horn 
Franz Nicolay – accordion

References

2017 albums
Radiator King albums